Ray Wilson Live is a live album from Ray Wilson. It was originally made available on the Sandport label through Ray Wilson's website in March 2005, before a wider release on the InsideOut label in December 2005.

Track listing

Disc 1
 "Intro" (Ray Wilson)
 "These Are the Changes" (R. Wilson)
 "Goodbye Baby Blue" (R. Wilson)
 "In the Air Tonight" (Phil Collins)
 "The Carpet Crawlers" (Tony Banks, Collins, Peter Gabriel, Steve Hackett, Mike Rutherford)
 "Ever the Reason" (R. Wilson)
 "Story" (R. Wilson)
 "Follow You Follow Me" (Banks, Collins, Rutherford)
 "Sarah" (R. Wilson)
 "Change" (R. Wilson)
 "Another Day" (R. Wilson)
 "Magic Train" (R. Wilson)
 "Sunshine and Butterflies" (Peter Lawlor)
 "Inside" (Lawlor)
 "Footsteps" (Lawlor)
 "I Can't Dance" (Banks, Collins, Rutherford)
 "Gypsy" (R. Wilson)

Disc 2
 "The Actor" (R. Wilson)
 "Alone" (R. Wilson)
 "Ripples" (Banks, Rutherford)
 "Along the Way" (Steve Wilson)
 "Biko" (Gabriel)
 "Lover's Leap" (Banks, Collins, Gabriel, Hackett, Rutherford)
 "No Son of Mine" (Banks, Collins, Rutherford)
 "Shipwrecked" (Banks, Rutherford)
 "Not About Us" (Banks, Rutherford, R. Wilson)
 "Sometimes" (R. Wilson)
 "The Lamb Lies Down on Broadway" (Banks, Collins, Gabriel, Hackett, Rutherford)
 "Swing Your Bag" (R. Wilson)
 "Knockin' on Heaven's Door" (Bob Dylan)
 "The Airport Song" (R. Wilson)
 "Rest in Peace" (Lawlor)

Personnel
Ray Wilson - vocals, lead/acoustic guitars, mouth organ
Irvin Duguid - keyboards
Steve Wilson - lead/acoustic guitars
Lawrie MacMillan - bass
Ashley MacMillan - drums

References

Ray Wilson (musician) albums
2005 live albums
Inside Out Music live albums